Streets of New York may refer to:

Music
 Streets of New York (album), a 2006 album by Willie Nile
 "Streets of New York" (Kool G Rap & DJ Polo song)
 "Streets Of New York", a 1981 song by The Wolfe Tones, reached #1 in Ireland
 "Streets of New York", a 2003 song by Alicia Keys from The Diary of Alicia Keys UK and Japanese edition
 "Streets of NY", a 2004 song by Terror Squad from True Story
 The Streets of New York (In Old New York)

Film
 Streets of New York (1939 film), a film by William Nigh
 The Streets of New York (1922 film), a silent film starring Dorothy Mackaill

See also
New York Avenue (disambiguation)
 New York Streets, a former National Arena League member
List of numbered streets in Manhattan
List of eponymous streets in New York City